Woodpark is a suburb of Sydney, in the state of New South Wales, Australia. Woodpark is located 29 kilometres west of the Sydney central business district in the local government area of the Cumberland Council.

Commercial area
Woodpark is a small suburb located in Western Sydney. It contains a small row of cafes, bakeries and convenience stores near the main road, and two stops on the T-way bus system. There is a park across the road from the shops. The area had experienced growth in recent times due to award-winning cafes.

Demographics
The most common ancestries in Woodpark were Australian 21.5%, English 13.7%, Lebanese 12.3%, Irish 5.2% and Italian 4.2%.
56.2% of people only spoke English at home. Other languages spoken at home included Arabic 17.2%, Hindi 2.9%, Cantonese 2.4%, Italian 2.3% and Greek 2.0%.
66.7% of people were born in Australia. The most common countries of birth were Lebanon 4.8%, New Zealand 2.9%, Fiji 2.3%, Philippines 1.5% and England 1.4%.
The most common responses for religion were Catholic 45.1%, Anglican 16.1%, Islam 8.3%, No Religion 6.7% and Eastern Orthodox 6.3%.

References

External links 

Suburbs of Sydney
Cumberland Council, New South Wales